John Rolle (1522–1570) of Stevenstone, in the parish of St Giles in the Wood, near Great Torrington, Devon, was the eldest son and heir of George Rolle (died 1552), MP, founder of the great Rolle family of Stevenstone, by his second wife Eleanor Dacres. Three monuments survive in memory of his immediate family in the churches of St Giles in the Wood and Chittlehampton.

Marriage and children
He married Margaret Ford, daughter of John Ford (died 1538) of Ashburton, the son and heir of William Ford of Chagford. John Ford purchased the estate of Bagtor in the parish of Ilsington, which his male heirs successively made their seat. Margaret's great nephew was John Ford (1586-c.1639) the dramatist, who was baptised at Ilsington, and her great-great-nephew was Sir Henry Ford (1617-1684), MP for Tiverton and Secretary of State for Ireland. By his wife he had eight sons and two daughters:

Sons
Sir Henry Rolle (1545–1625) of Stevenstone, eldest son and heir, who married twice:
Firstly to Elizabeth Watts, daughter and heiress of Roger Watts of Somerset, from which marriage were descended his heir to Stevenstone, namely his grandson Denys Rolle (1614–1638), son of Sir Henry Rolle (d.1617) who predeceased his father.
Secondly, without issue, to Joan Fortescue, daughter of John Fortescue of Fallapit in the parish of East Allington
Richard Rolle.
Valentine Rolle (1545-1624), of Torrington, died childless.
Alexander Rolle, who married Frances Lippingcott, daughter of John Lippingcott of Webbery. Alverdiscott
George Rolle who died childless.
Joachim Rolle who died childless in 1638. He married Mary Venner (1579-1651), a daughter of William Venner of Hudscott, Chittlehampton. A mural monument to Joachim survives in Chittlehampton Church.
Robert Rolle (1559-1628)
John Rolle (born 1563), who in 1603 married Phillipa Halse (d.1655), daughter of Richard Halse of Kenedon. Their eldest son Henry Rolle (1605-1647) of Beam eventually succeeded to the vast Stevenstone estates of his cousin Denys Rolle (1614–1638)

Daughters
Margerie Rolle, wife of Richard Baker.  
Honor Rolle, named after Honor Grenville, Viscountess Lisle (c.1493–1566), who with her husband Arthur Plantagenet, 1st Viscount Lisle was an important client of John Rolle's father, the lawyer and patriarch of the Rolle family George Rolle (d.1552). In 1569 she married Thomas Pomeroy (1543-1615) of "Bingley", son and heir of Sir Thomas Pomeroy (1503-1566) feudal baron of Berry Pomeroy in Devon, who in 1547 had sold his ancient inheritance of Berry Pomeroy Castle and the manor of Berry Pomeroy to Edward Seymour, 1st Duke of Somerset.

Monumental brasses in St Giles in the Wood Church
A small monumental brass to John Rolle survives in the floor of the south aisle of St Giles in the Wood parish church, beneath the separate brass figure of his wife Margaret Ford, but formerly affixed to his two and a half foot high chest tomb situated in the chancel of the church as recorded by Prince in his 1710 work "Worthies of Devon". It shows the arms of Rolle impaling Ford.

The monumental brass of his wife Margaret is affixed to the wall. To the left is a brass plaque depicting her two daughters (see above) and to the left a plaque showing her eight sons (see above).

References

Sources

Vivian, Lt.Col. J.L., (Ed.) The Visitations of the County of Devon: Comprising the Heralds' Visitations of 1531, 1564 & 1620, Exeter, 1895, pedigree of Rolle, pp. 652–653.
Lauder, Rosemary, Devon Families, Tiverton, 2002, pp. 67–68, Rolle Family.

Rolle family